Sir Trevor Denby Lloyd-Hughes (31 March 1922 – 15 February 2010) was a British civil servant who served as Downing Street Press Secretary to Prime Minister Harold Wilson between 1964 and 1969.

Career
Lloyd-Hughes was educated at Woodhouse Grove School and Jesus College, Oxford. He saw active service with the 75th (Shropshire Yeomanry) Medium Regiment, Royal Artillery in Italy during the Second World War.

He spent 14 years as a journalist with the Liverpool Daily Post and, in that role, got to know Harold Wilson who was then the member of parliament for Huyton. Lloyd-Hughes was then recruited by Wilson and served as Downing Street Press Secretary to the Prime Minister between 1964 and 1969.

Lloyd-Hughes received a knighthood in 1970.

References

Further reading 

 Lloyd-Hughes' entry at Who's Who

1922 births
2010 deaths
Alumni of Jesus College, Oxford
British civil servants
British special advisers
People educated at Woodhouse Grove School